Kundig or Kündig is a surname. Notable people with the surname include: 

Kerstin Kündig (born 1993), Swiss handballer
Tom Kundig (born 1954), American architect
Olson Kundig Architects, American architectural firm based in Seattle